New Line Cinema is one of the ten major Hollywood movie studios.

New Line may also refer to:
New Line Theatre, an alternative musical theatre company in St. Louis, Missouri
New Line (shipping line) or Robert Kermits Red Star Line
New Line Records, a record label; formerly known as New Line Records, currently WaterTower Music
Newline, a character or sequence of characters signifying the end of a line of text
Watford DC line or New Line, a commuter railway line from London Euston to Watford Junction
Tokyo Metro Line 13 or Yūrakuchō New Line, a Tokyo Metro subway line
Colt New Line, a line of Colt's revolvers manufactured from 1873 to 1886.